Facundo Leiva (born 10 September 1997) is an Argentine professional footballer who plays as a midfielder for Santamarina.

Career
Leiva was formed in Santamarina's youth system. In 2016, Leiva was loaned to Torneo Federal C's Unicen. Two years later, on 4 January 2018, he returned to the fifth tier of Argentine football by signing for Centro Social Velense on loan. However, on 12 January, Leiva was recalled by Santamarina manager Héctor Arzubialde to feature in the 2017–18 Primera B Nacional. He was firstly on the bench for a fixture with Juventud Unida on 18 March, before making his professional bow a week later during a draw with Agropecuario. He made five subsequent appearances as they finished bottom of the table.

Career statistics
.

References

External links

2000 births
Living people
Place of birth missing (living people)
Argentine footballers
Association football midfielders
Primera Nacional players
Club y Biblioteca Ramón Santamarina footballers